Ahpeatone is an unincorporated community in Cotton County, Oklahoma, United States. It is named after Ahpeahtone, a Native American chief.

References

Unincorporated communities in Cotton County, Oklahoma
Unincorporated communities in Oklahoma